"Time Warp" is a song featured in the 1973 rock musical The Rocky Horror Show, its 1975 film adaptation The Rocky Horror Picture Show, and a 2016 TV production. The name is also used for the dance performed during the chorus of the song. The song is both an example and a parody of the dance song genre, with much of the lyrics consisting of dance step instructions. This dance is one of the major audience-participation activities during screenings of the film and performances of the show. It has become a popular song beyond the reaches of the film and show, and is often played at dances and weddings.

The song is in the key of A major.

Placement 

"Time Warp" was the fifth song in the original stage show (after "Science Fiction/Double Feature", "Dammit Janet", "Over at the Frankenstein Place" and "Sweet Transvestite"), but fourth in the film (following "Over at the Frankenstein Place" and preceding "Sweet Transvestite"). Stage productions continued to use the original placing until Richard O'Brien revised the script for the 1990 West End revival in which he moved the song to the film's placing. For reasons of pacing, most productions now follow this order.

The song begins at 19:35 in the film's DVD release. It consists of verses sung by alternating characters, serving as the introduction to two of them, and choruses sung by the "Transylvanians" (film) or "Phantoms" (play), and the Criminologist/Narrator (played by Charles Gray in the film). The characters that sing the verses are, in order, Riff-Raff, Magenta, and Columbia (played in the film by Richard O'Brien, Patricia Quinn, and Little Nell Campbell). After the second full chorus, Columbia often launches into her tap dance.

The order of the solos varies in certain recordings. In the film and Roxy cast album, Columbia's solo is right after Magenta's, with Columbia's tap dance following the second chorus. Recent stage performances have the solos in this order but with Columbia's tap dance immediately after her solo, leaving only two choruses. Occasionally, Columbia's solo and tap dance follow the chorus after Magenta's solo.

Meat Loaf's voice is prominent in the chorus of the film version of the song. The song is reprised briefly at the end of the film, in flashback, and in the show as an encore led by Dr. Frank N. Furter.

Charts

Weekly charts

Year-end charts

Certifications

Other appearances 
The Hillywood Show used the song in a Doctor Who parody, which David Tennant called "extraordinary".

Italian comedy rock band Elio e le Storie Tese recorded a parody cover of the song in 1996, entitled "Balla coi barlafüs" (i.e. "Dance with the idiots" in Milanese dialect), with completely new Italian lyrics which mock Umberto Bossi and his attempt, earlier that year, to rally up a human chain in order to link Polesine and Monviso, symbolically blocking the course of the river Po. Apart from the lyrics, the band's cover follows the original song in every detail. The music video for the cover, made as the opening credits sequence for the 1996 edition of Gialappa's Band's popular sport satire show Mai dire Gol, is also a very faithful reproduction of the original scene from the film (characters, sets, props, costumes and dances), down to the Criminologist, played by Giacomo Poretti of Aldo, Giovanni e Giacomo, asking what sort of dance is it. Daniele Luttazzi and Sabrina Ferilli starred as Brad and Janet, band leader Elio appeared as Riff Raff, Marina Massironi starred as Magenta, while the rest of the band (together with the cast of the show) were featured as Transylvanians.

In an episode of The Drew Carey Show, the song was played in alternating fashion with Peaches & Herb's 1978 disco hit "Shake Your Groove Thing", during a dance off in front of a movie theater, in which one group wishes to see Rocky Horror Picture Show and another wants to see Priscilla, Queen of the Desert.

In an episode for Season 27 of The Simpsons, the townsfolk sing a parody of the song, singing about all the naughty things adults do on Halloween.

Tenacious D released a music video using the song to promote voting in the 2020 US presidential election, with the slightly altered lyrics "it's just a jump to the left, and not a step to the right!"

Jane The Virgin features an episode (chapter sixty-seven) where Mateo and Jane’s boyfriend, Adam, dance to “The Time Warp.”

References

External links
Patricia Quinn discusses the Time Warp on  Studio 10
Fandango Movieclips: The Rocky Horror Picture Show - The Time Warp Scene 

1973 songs
2008 singles
Novelty and fad dances
Songs from Rocky Horror
Songs with lyrics by Richard O'Brien
RPM Top Singles number-one singles
Halloween songs
Songs about dancing
Songs with music by Richard Hartley (composer)